The 1968 Hounslow Council election took place on 9 May 1968 to elect members of Hounslow London Borough Council in London, England. The whole council was up for election and the Conservative party gained overall control of the council.

Background

Election result

Ward results

References

1968
1968 London Borough council elections